Bank of Hindostan (1770–1832), a now defunct bank, was the third oldest bank in India.

History 

It was established by the agency house of Alexander and Company. 

The Bank lived through three economic crises of the 18th century:

 The Recession of 1819

 The failure of Palmer and Co., a British agency house

 The Banking Crisis of 1832

Business Activities 

In India, the paper currency was first issued during British East India Company rule. The first paper notes were issued by the private banks such as Bank of Hindostan and the presidency banks during late 18th century. Via the Paper Currency Act of 1861, the British Government of India was conferred the monopoly to issue paper notes in India. It was liquidated in 1830–1832.

See also

Indian banking
List of banks in India
List of oldest banks in India

References

External links
 History of the Bank

1770 establishments in India
Banks established in 1770
1832 disestablishments in India
Banks disestablished in 1832
Defunct banks of India